Erastus Otis Haven (November 1, 1820 – August 2, 1881) was an American academic administrator, serving as president or chancellor of three universities in succession from 1863-1880. He was a bishop of the Methodist Episcopal Church from 1880 until his death.

Biography

Early life

Haven was born in Boston, Massachusetts to Jotham Haven, Jr. and Elizabeth (Spear) Haven, having descended from early colonists from Massachusetts Bay Colony, including Edmund Rice one of the founders of Sudbury, Massachusetts. He is also a descendant of John Alden of the Mayflower.

Education and early career

He graduated from Wesleyan University in 1842.  He had charge of a private academy at Sudbury, Massachusetts, while at the same time pursuing a course of theological and general study.  He became Principal of Amenia Seminary, New York, in 1846. He entered the Methodist ministry in the New York Annual Conference in 1848.  Five years later he accepted the professorship of Latin at the University of Michigan.  The following year he became the Chair of English language, literature and history.  He resigned in 1856 and returned to Boston, where he served as the editor of Zion's Herald for seven years.  During this time he also served two terms in the Massachusetts State Senate, and part of the time as an overseer of Harvard University.

Administrative appointments

In 1863 he became the second President of the University of Michigan, where he served for six years. He then became the sixth President of Methodist-related Northwestern University, Evanston, Illinois. In 1872 he was chosen Secretary of the Board of Education of the M.E. Church. In 1874 he became the Chancellor of Methodist-related Syracuse University in New York.  In 1880 he was elected a bishop.

Honors

He was given the degree of D.D. by Union College in 1854, and a few years later that of LL.D. by Ohio Wesleyan University. Prior to his election to the episcopacy, he served five times in the General Conference of the M.E. Church, and in 1879 visited Great Britain as a delegate of the M.E. Church to the parent Wesleyan body. A street in Evanston, Illinois is named in his memory and an endowed chair, currently held by Carole LaBonne and Luís Amaral, was established by Northwestern University.

Death

He died in Salem, Oregon, and was buried at Lee Mission Cemetery in Salem.

Selected writings

American Progress
The Young Man Advised, New York, 1855. (discourses delivered in the chapel of the University of Michigan)
Pillars of Truth, 1866. (on the evidences of Christianity)
Rhetoric
Autobiography of Erastus O. Haven, D.D., LL.D., 1883

See also
 84th Massachusetts General Court (1863)
List of bishops of the United Methodist Church
Presidents of Northwestern University

References

External links

 
 
 A Classic Town: The Story of Evanston By Frances Elizabeth Willard (1891)

Bishops of the Methodist Episcopal Church
American theologians
1820 births
1881 deaths
University of Michigan faculty
Presidents of the University of Michigan
Presidents of Syracuse University
Wesleyan University alumni
Harvard University people
Presidents of Northwestern University
Editors of Christian publications
Massachusetts state senators
American Methodist bishops
American essayists
American sermon writers
American autobiographers
Methodist writers
19th-century American newspaper editors
American speechwriters
Burials in Oregon
American male journalists
American male essayists
19th-century male writers
19th-century American politicians
19th-century essayists
19th-century American clergy